Norbert Madaras (born 1 December 1979 in Eger) is a Hungarian water polo player, who won the gold medal with the men's national team at the 2004 Summer Olympics and 2008 Summer Olympics. He also was on the squad that claimed the title at the 2003 World Aquatics Championships and the 2013 World Aquatics Championships. Madaras won the Euro League 2007 with Pro Recco.

Honours

National
 Olympic Games:  Gold medal – 2004, 2008
 World Championships:  Gold medal – 2003, 2013;  Silver medal – 2005, 2007
 European Championship:  Silver medal – 2006, 2014;  Bronze medal – 2003, 2008, 2012
 FINA World League:  Gold medal – 2003, 2004;  Silver medal – 2005, 2007, 2013, 2014;  Bronze medal – 2002
 FINA World Cup:  Silver medal – 2006, 2014
 Universiade: (Bronze medal – 2001)

Club
BVSC (BVSC-Brendon)
 Hungarian Cup (1x): 1999–2000

Vasas (Vasas-Plaket, Vasas-Plaket-Euroleasing) 
 Hungarian Cup (1x): 2001–02
 LEN Cup Winners' Cup (1x): 2001–02

Pro Recco (Ferla Pro Recco)
  Italian Championship (9x): 2005–06, 2006–07, 2007–08, 2008–09, 2009–10, 2010–11, 2011–12, 2012–13, 2013–14
  Italian Cup (7x): 2005–06, 2006–07, 2007–08, 2008–09, 2009–10, 2010–11, 2012–13, 2013–14
 LEN Champions League (4x): 2006–07, 2007–08, 2009–10, 2011–12
 LEN Super Cup (4x): 2007, 2008, 2010, 2012
 Adriatic League (1x): 2011–12

Szolnok (Szolnoki Dózsa-KÖZGÉP) 
 Hungarian Championship (2x): 2014–15, 2015–16
 Hungarian Cup (1x): 2014

Ferencváros (FTC PQS Waterpolo) 
 Hungarian Championship (1x): 2017–18
 LEN Euro Cup (2x): 2016–17, 2017–18
LEN Champions League (1x): 2018–19

Awards
 Member of the Hungarian team of year: 2003, 2004, 2008, 2013
 Hungarian Water Polo Player of the Year: 2010, 2012
 Ministerial Certificate of Merit (2012)

Orders
  Officer's Cross of the Order of Merit of the Republic of Hungary (2004)
  Commander's Cross of the Order of Merit of the Republic of Hungary (2008)

See also
 Hungary men's Olympic water polo team records and statistics
 List of Olympic champions in men's water polo
 List of Olympic medalists in water polo (men)
 List of men's Olympic water polo tournament top goalscorers
 List of world champions in men's water polo
 List of World Aquatics Championships medalists in water polo

References

External links
 
 Norbert Madaras at Pro Recco (archived)

1979 births
Living people
Sportspeople from Eger
Hungarian male water polo players
Water polo drivers
Left-handed water polo players
Water polo players at the 2004 Summer Olympics
Water polo players at the 2008 Summer Olympics
Water polo players at the 2012 Summer Olympics
Medalists at the 2004 Summer Olympics
Medalists at the 2008 Summer Olympics
Olympic gold medalists for Hungary in water polo
World Aquatics Championships medalists in water polo
Universiade medalists in water polo
Universiade bronze medalists for Hungary
Hungarian expatriate sportspeople in Italy
Expatriate water polo players